This is a list of airlines currently operating in Djibouti.

See also
 List of airlines
 List of air carriers banned in the European Union
 List of defunct airlines of Djibouti
 List of companies based in Djibouti

Djibouti

Airlines
Airlines
Djibouti